Admiral Anderson may refer to:

Edwin Anderson Jr. (1860–1933), U.S. Navy admiral
David Murray Anderson (1874–1936), British Royal Navy admiral
Walter Stratton Anderson (1881–1981), U.S. Navy vice admiral
George Whelan Anderson Jr. (1906–1992), U.S. Navy admiral
William Lovett Anderson (1906–2004), U.S. Navy rear admiral
Neil Anderson (RNZN officer) (1927–2010), Royal New Zealand Navy vice admiral
John Rogers Anderson (born 1941), Royal Canadian Navy admiral
Mark Anderson (Royal Navy officer), British Royal Navy rear admiral
Edward L. Anderson, U.S. Navy rear admiral

See also
General Anderson (disambiguation)